Critical Policy Studies is a quarterly peer-reviewed academic journal that relates political theory to the fields of public and social policy. According to the Journal Citation Reports, the journal had a 2019 impact factor of 1.868.

Abstracting and indexing
The journal is abstracted and indexed in the following databases:
EBSCO databases
Emerging Sources Citation Index
Scopus

References

External links

Routledge academic journals
English-language journals
Quarterly journals
Sociology journals